The Action Group on Erosion, Technology, and Concentration (ETC), is an international organization dedicated to "the conservation and sustainable advancement of cultural and ecological diversity and human rights."  'ETC' is intended to be pronounced "et cetera." ETC often publishes opinions on scientific research by its staff and board members in topics including community and regional planning, ecology and evolutionary biology, and political science.

History

The ETC Group was known as RAFI (Rural Advancement Foundation International) until 1 September 2001, and its history runs back to the National Sharecroppers Fund that was established in the 1930s by Eleanor Roosevelt (among others) to alleviate the plight of the poor, mostly black tenant farmers in the U.S.

In the early 1970s, Pat Mooney, Hope Shand, and Cary Fowler began working on the Seeds Issue through the Rural Advancement Foundation—and, in time, set up an international arm concerned with the rights of farmers in the global south.

RAFI pioneered civil society research, critiques, and advocacy on farmers' rights, seed monopoly laws, and opposes the adoption of genetic engineering in agriculture, patents on life and, biopiracy (a term that RAFI coined) and new life science technologies such as terminator technology, genomic technologies, and nanotechnology. RAFI played a key role in pushing for and shaping UN recognition of farmers' rights and the International Treaty on Plant Genetic Resources for Food and Agriculture.

Advised to change their name in order to secure nonprofit status in the United States, RAFI launched a name change contest on their website in early 2001. After consulting hundreds of suggestions the organization decided upon ETC Group (etcetera).

Geoengineering
The organization has taken a public campaigning stance against geoengineering, including a campaign called "Hands off Mother Earth!", which was launched in April 2010. 
In October 2010 a comprehensive report titled "Geopiracy - The Case Against Geoengineering" was published, covering proposed technologies, governance discussions, geoengineering key players and the roles and interests of military and, corporations.

Diana Bronson of the ETC Group stated global warming was caused by "the scientific, corporate and political establishment of developed countries", and to now think those same people will correct the climate crisis and the biosphere is naive.

Synthetic biology

The ETC group publicly campaigns for increased regulation in the emerging scientific field of synthetic biology, which they refer to as "extreme genetic engineering". The group's major areas of concern surrounding this field include corporate involvement and potential threats to biosafety and biosecurity. In an effort to inform opinion about synthetic biology, the ETC Group has released several comic-style illustrations regarding "Synthia", the cell with the first synthetic genome created by Craig Venter and the J. Craig Venter Institute. The illustration titled "The Story of Synthia" has also been adapted into a short video that can be viewed on YouTube.

On December 16, 2010, the Presidential Commission for the Study of Bioethical Issues released a report that recommended self-regulation by synthetic biologists, stating that the infant technology posed few risks to society. This decision was strongly opposed by Jim Thomas of the ETC Group, who referred to the recommendations by the commission as "disappointingly empty and timid". The ETC group joined a group of over 50 environmental groups calling for a moratorium on synthetic biology in a letter to government officials that referred to the results of the commission as "irresponsible and dangerous" and stated that "self-regulation amounts to no regulation".

On January 23, 2012,  UC Berkeley's Richmond Field Station was chosen for the Lawrence Berkeley National Lab's second campus. In a news conference meant to address the concerns surrounding synthetic biology at the local, national, and international levels, five panelists including Jim Thomas of ETC Group, spoke on the risks associated with synthetic biology. The panel refers to the laboratory's association with UC Berkeley as a "shiny veneer" for a poorly regulated industry with dangerous consequences, and Thomas referred to the "1.6 billion dollar industry" as "genetic engineering on steroids".

See also
Climate engineering
Marine cloud brightening
Mycoplasma laboratorium
 Biological patent

References

External links
 ETC group - Action Group on Erosion, Technology, and Concentration
 The ETC Blog

Appropriate technology organizations
Environmental justice organizations
Environmental organizations based in the United States
Climate change organizations based in the United States
Climate engineering
Planetary engineering
Synthetic biology
Organizations established in the 1930s
1930s establishments in the United States
Year of establishment missing